Lamarqueavis is an extinct genus of prehistoric birds from the Cimolopterygidae known from Late Cretaceous-aged rocks from Argentina, Canada, and the United States. The type species, L. australis, was named in 2010 and is based on the holotype MML 207, a partial right coracoid found in the Allen Formation, Argentina. Two other species, L. minima, based on the holotype UCMP 53976, a right coracoid found in the Lance Formation, Wyoming, and L. petra, based on the holotype AMNH 21911, a left coracoid also found in the Lance Formation, Wyoming, were transferred over from Cimolopteryx to Lamarqueavis in 2010. A third unnamed species is known from the Dinosaur Park Formation of Alberta, Canada.

References 

Late Cretaceous birds of North America
Prehistoric bird genera
Prehistoric ornithurans
Fossil taxa described in 2010